The 2004 UMass Minutemen football team represented the University of Massachusetts Amherst in the 2004 NCAA Division I-AA football season as a member of the Atlantic 10 Conference. The team was coached by Don Brown and played its home games at Warren McGuirk Alumni Stadium in Hadley, Massachusetts. The Minutemen struggled in their first year under Coach Brown, but finished the season with a three-game winning streak and promise for the future. UMass finished second in the North division of the A-10 with a record of 6–5 (4–4 A-10).

Schedule

References

UMass
UMass Minutemen football seasons
UMass Minutemen football